Pseudolmedia manabiensis is a species of plant in the family Moraceae. It is endemic to Ecuador.

References

Endemic flora of Ecuador
manabiensis
Critically endangered plants
Taxonomy articles created by Polbot